Lee Eon (5 February 1981 – 21 August 2008) was a South Korean actor and model best known for his performance in the Korean television series Coffee Prince.

Early life and career 
Lee Eon was born Park Sang-min on 5 February 1981. Lee began practicing ssireum while in elementary school, going on to win gold medals at Korean national ssireum competitions in 1997 and 1998. As a freshman at university, he was inspired by Cha Seung-won to become a model, and after losing  made his debut at a fashion show in Busan in 1999. His later fashion show appearances included the Seoul Fashion Artists Association Collection.

Lee branched out into acting, making his film debut in 2006; he played a ssireum wrestler in Like a Virgin, putting his skills to good use and helping lead actor Ryu Deok-hwan learn the moves. He later appeared in the 2007 hit drama series Coffee Prince, and made his final appearance in KBS period drama Strongest Chil Woo.

Death and commemorations 
Lee died in a motorcycle accident on 21 August 2008. He had been riding home from a party celebrating the airing of the last episode of Strongest Chil Woo, when his motorcycle hit the guardrail of an overpass in Hannam-dong, Seoul, at around 2 a.m. He died at the scene from a broken neck and was taken to the nearby Soonchunhyang University Hospital. Many of his colleagues attended his funeral, including Gong Yoo, his co-star in Coffee Prince, who took leave from his military service to hold Lee's memorial tablet in the procession to the grave site.

Filmography

Awards and nominations

References

External links 

Motorcycle road incident deaths
Road incident deaths in South Korea
South Korean male film actors
South Korean male television actors
South Korean male models
South Korean ssireum practitioners
South Korean male sport wrestlers
1981 births
2008 deaths